Acleris emargana, the notched-winged tortricid, is a moth of the family Tortricidae. The species was first described by Johan Christian Fabricius in 1775.

Subspecies
Acleris emargana emargana (Europe to Japan)
Acleris emargana tibetica (Tibet)

Acleris emargana blackmorei, described as occurring in North America, was formerly considered a subspecies of A. emargana. Per Karsholt et al. (2005), it is now considered synonymous with Acleris effractana.

Description
Acleris emargana has a wingspan of 18–22 mm. Appearance can vary between individuals within the species. In general, the forewings are greyish brown or yellow ochreous, lightly translucent, usually more or less notched and hooked on the costa, with a reticulated (net-like) pattern. Hindwings are greyish and translucent. Julius von Kennel provides a full description. 

The moths are on wing from July to November and fly at dusk.

The larvae can reach a length of about 15 mm. They are pale green, with a pale brown head. Caterpillars feed on the leaves and shoots of various trees, including Alnus glutinosa, Corylus, Salix, Populus and Betula.

Distribution
The nominotypical subspecies Acleris emargana emargana is found from Europe to Siberia, northern China, Korea and Japan. In Tibet, ssp. Acleris emargana tibetica is found.

Gallery

References

External links

 Notched-winged tortricid on UKMoths
 BioLib.cz
 Eurasian Tortricinae
 Lepidoptera of Belgium
 Lepiforum e.V.

emargana
Moths described in 1775
Moths of Asia
Tortricidae of Europe
Moths of North America
Taxa named by Johan Christian Fabricius